Shohei Yabiku (屋比久翔平, Yabiku Shōhei; born January 4, 1995) is a Japanese Greco-Roman wrestler. He qualified for the 2020 Summer Olympics, having finished runner-up to Akzhol Makhmudov in men's Greco-Roman 77 kg at the 2021 Asian Qualification Tournament in Almaty, Kazakhstan. In the 77 kg event, Yabiku won a bronze medal.

He competed in the 77kg event at the 2022 World Wrestling Championships held in Belgrade, Serbia.

References

External links
 

1995 births
Living people
Japanese male sport wrestlers
Olympic wrestlers of Japan
Wrestlers at the 2020 Summer Olympics
Sportspeople from Okinawa Prefecture
Olympic medalists in wrestling
Medalists at the 2020 Summer Olympics
Olympic bronze medalists for Japan
21st-century Japanese people